Hoseynabad (also Romanized as Ḩoseynābād and Hosein Abad; also known as Ḩoseynābād-e Khodābandehlū and Husainābād) is a village in Deymkaran Rural District, Salehabad District, Bahar County, Hamadan Province, Iran. At the 2006 census, its population was 601, in 134 families.

References 

Populated places in Bahar County